Latin Pop Airplay is a chart that ranks the top-performing songs (regardless of genre or language) on Latin pop radio stations in the United States, published by Billboard magazine based on weekly airplay data compiled by Nielsen's Broadcast Data Systems. It is a subchart of Hot Latin Songs, which lists the best-performing Spanish-language songs in the country. In 1996, 16 songs topped the chart, in 52 issues of the magazine.

The first number one of the year was "Más Allá" by Gloria Estefan, which had been in the top spot since the issue dated December 30, 1995, and spent a total of three weeks at this position. Enrique Iglesias, Cristian Castro, Luis Miguel, and Soraya were the only acts to have more than one chart-topper in 1996. Iglesias's debut single, "Si Tú Te Vas", became his first chart-topper and spent two weeks at number one. He also had the best-performing Latin pop song of the year with "Por Amarte" despite it only spending one week at number one. Castro's self-penned track, "Amor", held the top spot for the longest in 1996 with 10 weeks. "Sueña", which spent four weeks at number one, is the Spanish-language adaptation of "Someday" from Disney's 1996 film The Hunchback of Notre Dame, which Miguel recorded for the Latin American edition of the movie's soundtrack. Soraya achieved her only number ones with "De Repente" and "Amor en Tus Ojos".

Other artists to top the chart for the first time in 1996 were Shakira with "Estoy Aquí" and Chayanne with "Solamente Tu Amor", while Olga Tañón, Amanda Miguel, and Eros Ramazzotti obtained their first and only chart-toppers in the year. Both "Estoy Aquí" and Ramazzotti's "La Cosa Más Bella" (originally recorded in Italian as "Più bella cosa") held the top spot for four weeks. "Ámame una Vez Más" by Amanda Miguel was number one song for the longest, at eight weeks, by a female act. It also won the Billboard Latin Music Award for Latin Pop Song of the Year in 1997. The final number one of the year was "Las Cosas Queue Vives" by Laura Pausini, the Spanish-language version of her song "Le cose che vivi".

Chart history

See also
1996 in Latin music

References

United States Latin Pop Airplay
1996
1996 in Latin music
1996 in American music